Douglas Charles French (born 20 March 1944) is a retired Conservative Party politician in the United Kingdom.

Political career
French was educated at Glyn Grammar School, Epsom and St Catharine's College, Cambridge. Having stood unsuccessfully for Sheffield Attercliffe in 1979, he was elected to the House of Commons at the 1987 general election as Member of Parliament for Gloucester, succeeding former minister Sally Oppenheim. He was re-elected at the 1992 general election, but was defeated at the 1997 general election by the Labour Party candidate, Tess Kingham.

References

External links 
 

1944 births
Living people
Conservative Party (UK) MPs for English constituencies
UK MPs 1987–1992
UK MPs 1992–1997
Alumni of St Catharine's College, Cambridge
Members of Parliament for Gloucester
People educated at Glyn School